Sowmeeh-ye Rudbar (also Romanized as Şowme‘eh-ye Rūdbār; also known as Şowma‘eh Sarā) is a village in Shal Rural District, Shahrud District, Khalkhal County, Ardabil Province, Iran. At the 2006 census, its population was 64, in 17 families.

References 

Tageo

Towns and villages in Khalkhal County